Ruben Seyram Reisig (born 16 March 1996) is a German-Ghanaian footballer who plays as a defensive midfielder or centre-back for SGV Freiberg.

Career
Reisig made his professional debut for VfR Aalen in the 3. Liga on 25 July 2015, coming on as a substitute in the 90th minute for Matthias Morys in the 0–0 home draw against Chemnitzer FC.

References

External links
 Profile at DFB.de
 Profile at kicker.de
 Ruben Reisig at FuPa

1996 births
Living people
German footballers
Ghanaian footballers
German sportspeople of Ghanaian descent
Association football central defenders
VfR Aalen players
SSV Reutlingen 05 players
Stuttgarter Kickers players
3. Liga players
Regionalliga players
Oberliga (football) players